Motasemabad (also Romanized as Mo‘taşemābād; also known as Javādīyeh) is a village in Miyan Rud Rural District, Qolqol Rud District, Tuyserkan County, Hamadan Province, Iran. At the 2006 census, its population was 265, in 57 families.

References 

Populated places in Tuyserkan County